Microhyle is a genus of moths in the subfamily Arctiinae. The genus was erected by George Hampson in 1905.

Species
Microhyle fadella (Mabille, 1882)
Microhyle leopardella Toulgoët, 1972
Microhyle macularia Toulgoët, 1976
Microhyle viettei Toulgoët, 1976

References

External links

Lithosiini